Margaret Clarke may refer to:
 Margaret Clarke (artist) (1888–1961), Irish portrait painter
 Margaret Clarke (chess) (1937–2018),  British chess player
 Margaret Turner Clarke (1836–1887), Australian nurse
 Margaret Clarke (actress), in Espedair Street
 Margaret Clarke (camogie), see All-Ireland Senior Camogie Championship 1959

See also
 Margaret Clark (disambiguation)
 Maggie Clarke, environmental scientist
 Peggy Clarke (disambiguation)